Sorin Poenaru (born 10 September 1938) is a Romanian fencer. He competed in the team foil event at the 1960 Summer Olympics.

References

1938 births
Living people
People from Câmpina
Romanian male fencers
Romanian foil fencers
Olympic fencers of Romania
Fencers at the 1960 Summer Olympics